The Monastery's Hunter is a 1953 West German historical drama film directed by Harald Reinl and starring Erich Auer, Marianne Koch and Paul Hartmann. It is based on the 1892 novel of the same title by Ludwig Ganghofer which had previously been made into a 1920 silent film and a 1935 sound film.

It was shot at the Bavaria Studios in Munich and on location around the Königssee, the Dolomites, Rome and Dalmatia. The film's sets were designed by the art director Carl M. Kirmse.

Cast

References

Bibliography

External links 
 

1953 films
1950s historical drama films
German historical drama films
West German films
1950s German-language films
Films directed by Harald Reinl
Films based on German novels
Films based on works by Ludwig Ganghofer
Films about hunters
Remakes of German films
Films set in Bavaria
Films set in the Alps
Films set in the 14th century
Films shot in Italy
Films shot at Bavaria Studios
1950s German films